The 2002 World University Baseball Championship was an under-23 international college baseball tournament that was held from August 2 to 11, 2002. The final game was held on August 11, 2002 in Messina, Italy. It was the first time the University Championship took place. Italy hosted the tournament and 10 nations competed.

In the end, the Cuba won their first University Championship, over a win against runner-up United States.

Round 1

Pool A

Pool B

Round 2

Final standings

References

World University Baseball Championship
World University Championship
2002 in Italian sport
International baseball competitions hosted by Italy
Sports competitions in Messina